The Infancy Gospel of Thomas is a biographical gospel about the childhood of Jesus, believed to date at the latest to the second century. 
The Infancy Gospel of Thomas is generally considered to be Gnostic in origin because of references in letters (by Hippolytus of Rome and Origen of Alexandria) to a "Gospel of Thomas", but it is unclear whether those letters refer to the Infancy Gospel or the Gospel of Thomas, a sayings gospel discovered near Nag Hammadi, Egypt in 1945. 

Proto-orthodox Christians regarded the Infancy Gospel of Thomas as inauthentic and heretical. Eusebius rejected it as a heretical "fiction" in the third book of his fourth-century Church History, and Pope Gelasius I included it in his list of heretical books in the fifth century.

Dating
The first known quotation of the Infancy Gospel of Thomas is from Irenaeus of Lyon around AD 180, who calls it spurious and apocryphal. Scholars generally agree on a date in the mid-to-late-2nd century AD. There are two 2nd-century documents, the Epistula Apostolorum and Irenaeus' Adversus haereses, that refer to a story of Jesus's tutor telling him, "Say alpha," and Jesus replied, "First tell me what is beta, and I can tell you what alpha is." At least some period of oral transmission of the source material is generally believed to have occurred, either wholly or as several different stories before it was first transcribed and over time redacted. Thus, both of these documents and the Infancy Gospel of Thomas possibly all refer to the oral versions of this story. The area of origin for the work is unknown and many proposed locations of origin have been put forward.

Besides the difficulty in its name, given that the work is not related to the Gospel of Thomas, the work is not a gospel but possibly an appendage to the Gospel of Luke or a stand-alone work that has a dependent association to the canonical Gospel texts. This infancy story ends with Jesus in the temple at age 12 quoting parts of the gospel of Luke. (see Infancy 19:1–12 and ).

Authorship
The author of the gospel is unknown.  In the earliest Syriac manuscripts, no author is indicated at all, indicating either a truncated introduction, an author who wished to remain anonymous, or a compilation of existing stories by an editor.  In later manuscripts dating from the Middle Ages, the Gospel opens with a prologue where "Thomas the Israelite" introduces himself, but with no further explanation.  It is possible that this was meant to hint that the author was Judas Thomas, better known as Thomas the Apostle, thought by some Christians to be a brother of Jesus and thus familiar with young Jesus's activities.

Manuscript tradition
Whether the original language of the Infancy Gospel of Thomas was Greek or Syriac is unknown. The few surviving Greek manuscripts provide no clues themselves because none predate the 13th century, whereas the earliest authorities, according to the editor and translator Montague Rhodes James, are a much abbreviated sixth-century Syriac version, and a Latin palimpsest of the fifth or sixth century, which has never been fully translated and can be found in Vienna. Many manuscripts, translations, shortened versions, alternates, and parallels have slight, nuanced differences. James found that their large number makes the compilation of an urtext very difficult. This number of texts and versions reflects the great popularity of the work during the High Middle Ages.

Of the many different versions and alternate forms (e.g. Greek, Syriac, Latin, Slavonic, etc.), the three principal forms are commonly referred to as given by Constantin von Tischendorf. Two of those are Greek texts which are called Greek Text A (Greek A); Greek Text B (Greek B); and the third is Latin. The first known publication of the Infancy Gospel of Thomas was by J Fabricius and has come to be known as Greek A. The Greek A is the most well-known form often used and in its full form is the longer of the two Greeks, based on at least 2 manuscripts. It consists of nineteen chapters with several alternate other manuscripts with abbreviated forms. The Greek B was found by Tischendorf on a trip to Mount Sinai in 1844, which is not only shorter (11 chapters), but is a different version of the well-known A text. It has some chapters abbreviated, other entire chapters left out completely, and few new lines. The Latin translations has two distinct form of versions from the Old Latin with the Late Latin. The Latin was notable as it was the first discovered with an Egyptian prologue.

Parts of the Latin version were translated into Old Irish poetry, probably around 700 CE according to James Carney, making this translation one of the earliest of this gospel.

Content
The text describes the life of the child Jesus from the age of five to age twelve, with fanciful, and sometimes malevolent, supernatural events. He is presented as a precocious child who starts his education early. The stories cover how the young Incarnation of God matures and learns to use his powers for good and how those around him first respond in fear and later with admiration. In another episode, a child disperses water that Jesus has collected. Jesus kills this first child, when at age one he curses a boy, which causes the child's body to wither into a corpse. Later, Jesus kills another child via curse when the child apparently accidentally bumps into Jesus, throws a stone at Jesus, or punches Jesus (depending on the translation).

When Joseph and Mary's neighbors complain, they are miraculously struck blind by Jesus. Jesus then starts receiving lessons, but arrogantly tries to teach the teacher, instead, upsetting the teacher who suspects supernatural origins. Jesus is amused by this suspicion, which he confirms, and revokes all his earlier apparent cruelty. Subsequently, he resurrects a friend who is killed when he falls from a roof, and heals another who cuts his foot with an axe. 

After various other demonstrations of supernatural ability, new teachers try to teach Jesus, but he proceeds to explain the law to them instead. Another set of miracles is mentioned in which Jesus heals his brother, who is bitten by a snake, and two others, who have died from different causes. Finally, the text recounts the episode in Luke in which Jesus, aged 12, teaches in the temple.

Although the miracles seem quite randomly inserted into the text, three miracles are before and three are after each of the sets of lessons. The structure of the story is essentially:

Bringing life to a dried fish (this is only present in later texts)
(First group)
3 Miracles - Breathes life into birds fashioned from clay, curses a boy, who then becomes a corpse (not present in Greek B), curses a boy who falls dead and his parents become blind
Attempt to teach Jesus which fails, with Jesus doing the teaching
3 Miracles - Reverses his earlier acts (this would include resurrecting the two boys and healing the blind parents), resurrects a friend who fell from a roof, heals a man who chopped his foot with an axe.
(Second group)
Three Miracles - carries water on cloth, produces a feast from a single grain, stretches a beam of wood to help his father finish constructing a bed
Attempts to teach Jesus, which fail, with Jesus doing the teaching
Three Miracles - heals James from snake poison, resurrects a child who died of illness, resurrects a man who died in a construction accident
Incident in the temple paralleling Luke

Episodes from Jesus's childhood as depicted in the Klosterneuburger Evangelienwerk, a 14th-century gospel translation:

See also
Acts of Thomas
List of Gospels
Unknown years of Jesus

Further reading
 Barnstone, Willis (ed.). The Other Bible, Harper Collins, 1984, pp. 398–403.

References

External links

 Early Christian Writings: Infancy Gospel of Thomas
 Gnostic Society Library: Infancy Gospel of Thomas introduction and translations by M.R. James, 1924

2nd-century manuscripts
3rd-century manuscripts
Thomas
Thomas, Infancy Gospel of
Thomas the Apostle
Treatises